Aksara (also akshara, Devanagari अक्षर, IAST  akṣara) is a Sanskrit term translating to "imperishable, indestructible, fixed, immutable" (i.e. from अ, a- "not" and क्षर्, kṣar- "melt away, perish").

It has two main fields of application, in  Sanskrit grammatical tradition (śikṣā) and in Vedanta philosophy.
The uniting aspect of these uses is the mystical view of language, or shabda, in Hindu tradition, and especially the notion of the syllable as a kind of immutable (or "atomic") substance of both language and truth, most prominently, the mystical syllable Aum, which is given the name of ekākṣara (i.e. eka-akṣara), which can be translated as both "the sole imperishable thing" and as "a single syllable".
In the explicitly monotheistic tradition of Bhakti yoga, both akṣara and aum become seen as a symbol or name of God.

Grammatical tradition

The akshara is the unit of graphemic symbols in the Brahmic scripts. An akshara is more a syllable-like unit for writing which requires the knowledge of syllables and the matra, i.e. the measure of prosodic marking. In writing it prototypically stands for CV, CVV, CCV, CCVV, CCCV, CCCVV, V and VV where "C" stands for a consonant, "V" for a vowel and "VV" for a long vowel. 
It is usually a sub-syllabic representation which stands for onset, onset plus nucleus and nucleus alone; the coda part of a syllable goes into the next akshara in a word.

Its nature favours the phonological mediation i.e. the non-lexical strategy of reading, which may be interpreted in stages such as  the "Visual Analysis System" and proceeding to the "Aksara Recognition System" and then to the "Aksara sound Conversion System" and the "Phonological Assembly System" before ending with the "Response Buffer" prior to reading aloud.

Vedanta

Aum

As part of basic instructions of Shiksha and Sanskrit grammar, it is explained that among the Word-entities, both, Aksara and Brahman stand out as especially important because both refer to a special form of ritual word. In the Brahmanas and the Upanishads both come to mean the Absolute.

Vedantic philosophy identified the aum syllable as alluded to in various concepts going back to the Rigveda, such as the concept of the "word" or "vāc" (e.g. RV 1.55.1) or inspiration (1.34.4, 8.36.7).
"It is the recipient of power and the dignity of the sacred word in a condensated and intensified degree, and as the essence and embryo of speech receives, more than the word itself the signification of transcendent Brahman".
In the Rigveda itself, akṣára does occur, but it is used as a name of  "water" (RV 1.34.4, 1.164.42).

The Manduka Upanishad partitions the symbol Aum in three different morae and adds a fourth mora-less part instructing that the mora-less part alone is ultimately real and not the other three representing "wakefulness", "dream" and the "sleep" states of consciousness. The mora-less part of Aum has correspondence with the fourth dimension of metaphysics, the Atman. Madhavananda in his commentary on the Brahmopanishad belonging to the Atharvaveda, explains that vide Mundaka Upanishad I.7 and II.1-2 the term Aksara signifies Brahman in Its aspect of the manifesting principle who Pippalada says is the thread (Sutram) to be worn instead of the sacrificial thread on the body which should be discarded.

Bhagavad Gita

According to the adherents of the Smrtis, the practitioners of the Bhakti yoga, Aksara means one who is present everywhere, denotes the name of Shiva and Vishnu, and also that of Brahman, literally it means imperishable, indestructible. And, because it is the term applied to Aum it is called the Aksara, the symbol of God who is the lord of all created things. It is a descriptive synonym of Brahman (Bhagavad Gita VIII.3) who is said to have arisen from Aksara (Bhagavad Gita III.15).

With regard to Vallabha’s view of Aum it is said that Aksara itself is imperishable and appears as souls endowed with Sat and Chit but not  as Ananda. For Vallabha,  Ananda, which is the first manifestation of God, is the actualisation of the absolute identity and selfness, whereas the second manifestation of God is the Aksara, the impersonal ground from which all determinations arise because it is the substratum of all finite forms that pre-exist but issue forth from it which though by itself is the intermediate form that lacks plenitude.

References

Vedanta
Sanskrit grammar
Sanskrit words and phrases
Yoga
Orthography